Time* Sex* Love* is the seventh studio album from American country music artist Mary Chapin Carpenter. It was released in 2001 on Columbia Records Nashville as her first studio album since A Place in the World five years previous. This album produced two singles in "Simple Life," which peaked at number 53 on Billboard's Hot Country chart, and "This Is Me Leaving You" which failed to chart. Despite its low airplay ranking, "Simple Life" spent 28 weeks on Billboard's Top 25 Country Singles Sales chart, peaking at number 8 on May 5, 2001.

The album was recorded at George Martin's Air Studios in London.

Track listing

Personnel
Mary Chapin Carpenter - acoustic guitar, lead vocals, background vocals
Jon Carroll - Hammond organ, piano, synthesizer, background vocals, Wurlitzer
David Daniels - cello
Isobel Griffiths - arranger, conductor, contractor
Nick Ingman - arranger, conductor, string arrangements
John Jennings - clevenger bass, 12-string electric guitar, acoustic guitar, baritone guitar, electric guitar, hi-string guitar, percussion, programming, slide guitar, tambourine, background vocals
Patrick Kiernan - violin
Boguslaw Kostecki - violin
Peter Lale - viola
Duke Levine - 12-string electric guitar, 12-string acoustic guitar, electric guitar, mandola, electric sitar, slide guitar
Rita Manning - violin
Dave Mattacks - drums, percussion
Steve Nathan - piano, synthesizer
Tony Pleeth - cello
Garrison Starr - background vocals
Mike Thompson - French horn
Brice White - viola
Glenn Worf - bass guitar, clevenger bass, fretless bass
Gavyn Wright - violin

Charts

Weekly charts

Year-end charts

References

External links

2001 albums
Columbia Records albums
Mary Chapin Carpenter albums
Albums produced by Blake Chancey
Albums recorded at AIR Studios